The 1978 WCT Tournament of Champions, also known by its sponsored name Shakey's Tournament of Champions,  was a men's tennis tournament played on outdoor carpet courts at the Las Vegas Hilton in Las Vegas in the United States. The event was part of the 1978 World Championship Tennis (WCT) tour, which in turn was part of the 1978 Grand Prix circuit, but was classified as a special event and as such did not count towards the Grand Prix rankings. It was the second edition of the tournament and was held from March 20 through March 26, 1978. Björn Borg won the singles title and the accompanying $60,000 first prize money.

Finals

Singles

 Björn Borg defeated  Vitas Gerulaitis 6–5, 5–6, 6–4, 6–5
 It was Borg's 3rd singles title of the year and the 33rd of his career.

References

External links
 ITF – tournament edition details

World Championship Tennis Tournament of Champions
WCT Tournament of Champions
WCT Tournament of Champions, 1978